The cast of the television series MythBusters perform experiments to verify or debunk urban legends, old wives' tales, and the like. This is a list of the various myths tested on the show as well as the results of the experiments (the myth is either busted, plausible, or confirmed). The 2014 season premiered on January 4, 2014, changing to a Saturday time slot. The show resumed in July, called a "new season" by the Discovery Channel. It then moved to a Thursday time slot.

This would be the last season for Kari Byron, Tory Belleci and Grant Imahara, after it was announced the build team would not be returning for the 2015 season. Hyneman and Savage would be the sole hosts of the show from this point onwards. In December 2014, Savage would go on to address the Build Team departures, indicating that the separation was a result of failed contract negotiations between Discovery Networks and the team members.

Episode overview

Episode 208 – "Star Wars Special"
 Original air date: January 4, 2014

Adam, Jamie, and the Build Team examined three scenes from the Star Wars film series—eventually choosing one scene from each episode of the original trilogy. This episode is alternatively referred to as "Revenge of the Myth" or "SithBusters." They tested...

Episode 209 – "Moonshiner Myths"
 Original air date: January 11, 2014

Exploding Still

Firewater Fuel

Episode 210 – "Hollywood Car Crash Cliches"
 Original air date: January 18, 2014

Adam, Jamie, and the Build Team explored three scenarios related to vehicle-based movie stunts and effects.

Slapstick Shatter

SUV vs. RPG

Traffic Ram

Episode 211 – "Car Chase Chaos / Animal Antics"
 Original US air date: January 25, 2014
 Original Australia air date: June 3, 2013

Car Chase Chaos
Adam and Jamie tested three different movie clichés involving car chases, seeing how they compared to driving normally:

Animal Avoidance
In an expansion of the myth that flies are repelled by water, the Build Team tested various "at home" methods for repelling various types of animals:

Serpent Stop
One myth was cut from the initial U.S. airing of the episode and was broadcast on the MythBusters' website:

Foil Cat Deterrent
Kari stated during a Twitter Q&A that the myth of cats being repelled by aluminum foil was also recorded, but it was cut from the U.S. airing and to date has not been released on the MythBusters' website. It had, however, been aired in the version of the episode aired in the Asia-Pacific region.

Episode 212 – "*DO* Try This at Home?"
 Original air date: February 1, 2014

Adam, Jamie, and the Build Team explored eight short myths to determine both their accuracy and the ease with which viewers might be able to test them at home.

Microwave Water

Extreme Extinguishing

N-Sync

Chain Reaction

Elephant Toothpaste

Exploding Snake

Soda Bomb Safety

Water Tricks

Episode 213 – "Mythssion Impossible"
 Original air date: February 15, 2014

Herding Cats

Greased Pig

Full of Cr*p

Episode 214 – "Bullet Baloney"
 Original air date: February 22, 2014

The MythBusters take on a series of filmic firearm cliches as follows:

Bent Barrel

What is Bulletproof? (v.6)
Using a mock-up of a carnival-style shooting gallery, the Build Team tested the effectiveness of some everyday items at stopping bullets, including:

Shotgun Spear

Gun in a Vacuum

Adam explained the reason for the second justification of the myth not being true on Twitter, stating that the accelerant in a bullet contains an oxygenator, thus rendering oxygen from the air unnecessary.

Neon Nightmare

Deep Fried Firearm

Episode 215 – "Supersonic Ping Pong/Ice Cannon"
 Original air date: March 1, 2014

Killer Ping Pong Ball

Ice Cannon

Episode 216 – "Fire in the Hole"
 Original air date: July 10, 2014

An examination of Hollywood movie scenarios involving explosions.

Grenade Shoot

Seconds from Disaster
The Build Team investigated the possibility of surviving a bomb explosion by placing the device in a container and diving out of the way.

They tested...

Out-of-Control Test
Outtakes of out-of-control tests from the Seconds from Disaster myth were published on the Discovery Channel website. Additionally, they tested...

The overall conclusion was that the best approach was to place the bomb somewhere that would redirect the explosion, then move away from where the blast was going to go. Attempting to fully contain an explosion would create deadly shrapnel that would kill anyone nearby.

Episode 217 – "Household Disasters"
 Original US air date: July 17, 2014
 Original Australia air date: May 26, 2014

{| class="wikitable plainrowheaders"
! scope"col" | Myth
! scope"col" | Status
! scope"col" | Notes
|-
| scope"row" | Certain types of sunscreen can make a human body susceptible to catching fire.
| style="color:orange" | Plausible
| Adam began by spraying/squirting various types of sunscreen into a lighter flame to see if they would ignite. The cream formulations failed to do so, but the spray-on products did ignite due to their highly flammable propellants (butane and propane). For their next test, they set up a mannequin next to a barbecue grill and sprayed it with sunscreen once the grill was hot. One spray caused an arm to briefly catch fire.

Replacing the mannequin with a pig carcass, they investigated the possibility that the sunscreen could ignite even well after it had been sprayed on, due to the presence of flammable solvents. With the grill lid closed, they sprayed the carcass, waited a certain length of time, then opened the lid to expose it to the flames. Delays of 3 minutes and 1 minute gave no results, but a delay of 5 seconds did cause the carcass to catch fire. They judged the myth plausible, and Jamie commented that spray-on sunscreen could ignite in the short time before the solvents evaporated.
|}

Piano Pile-Up

That Sucks

Water Heater Fire Extinguisher

Dog Bowl Ignition
This myth was not aired in the U.S.

Sunburn vs Burn-Burn
This myth was cut out of the episode but included online.

Episode 218 – "Commercial Myths"
 Original US air date: July 24, 2014
 Original Australia air date: May 19, 2014

Apple Bobbing Bungee

Tennis Take Off
Tory, Grant and Kari examine a myth that comes from a HEAD Tennis commercial that features Novak Djokovic rallying with a partner while the two are anchored to the wings of an airplane in flight.

Episode 219 – "Road Rage"
 Original US air date: July 31, 2014
 Original Australia air date: May 12, 2014

This episode is alternatively called "Silver Screen Car Chaos", as mentioned in the opening sequences, and "Driving This Crazy", for when it aired in Australia. Various car chase stereotypes from movies are tested.

Cliff Top Push Off

Wanted Car Flip

Two Wheel Wipe Out

Episode 220 – "Laws of Attraction"
 Original air date: August 7, 2014

{| class="wikitable plainrowheaders"
! scope"col" | Myth
! scope"col" | Status
! scope"col" | Notes
|-
| scope"row" | A person's intelligence deteriorates in the presence of members of the opposite gender.
| style="color:red" | Busted
| Adam designed a test in which the subject would have to identify the colors in which words were displayed on a screen as quickly as possible, while Jamie built a testing room on a commercial film stage. Five men and five women took the test twice, first with a member of the same gender sitting nearby in the room as a control run, then with a member of the opposite gender.

On their first run, the men achieved an average of 56.8 seconds, while the women averaged 50.2. However, the second run gave an average of 46.8 seconds for both groups, indicating an overall improvement in performance and leading Adam and Jamie to call the myth busted.
|-
| scope"row" | Men are more strongly attracted to blonde women than those of other hair colors.
| style="color:red" | Busted
| Adam and Jamie set up a speed-dating scenario in which 9 men spoke to each of 9 women for 3 minutes, then rated them on a numerical scale. The test was repeated three times, with a different group of men each time; the women used wigs to pass themselves off as blondes, brunettes, or redheads, changing them after each test so that every woman had all three hair colors. Adam and Jamie found no significant differences among the groups in any test, so they judged the myth to be busted.
|-
| scope"row" | Pheromone sprays can increase a person's attractiveness toward the opposite gender.
| style="color:red" | Busted
| Adam built a turntable with 10 airtight chambers, each holding a T-shirt treated with some combination of pheromone and/or sweat from either Adam or Jamie. A clean, unused shirt was also included as a control. One at a time, 50 women smelled every shirt and then voted for their favorite scent of the group. The shirt bearing both the pheromones and Adam's sweat proved the most popular, with 38% of the votes, but others either expressed a strong dislike of that smell or chose the control shirt. As a result, Adam and Jamie declared the myth busted.
|}

Storm in a D-Cup

Money Talk$

Episode 221 – "Traffic Tricks"
 Original US air date: August 7, 2014
 Original Australia air date: July 22, 2013

Lane Weave

Crossroads Conundrum

Episode 222 – "Plane Boarding"
 Original US air date: August 21, 2014
 Original Australia air date: September 12, 2012

The final US episode premiere to feature the Build Team of Kari Byron, Tory Belleci, and Grant Imahara.

Plane Boarding
The episode decided to use a myth on plane boarding; this was because of waiting time being the biggest complaint from flyers everywhere.

The following are the results of the experiment.

Bite the Bullet
A spinoff of Magic Bullet from 2003 and Ice Bullet from 2004.

References

General references

External links

 
 

2014
2014 American television seasons